The Battle of Almansa took place on 25 April 1707, during the War of the Spanish Succession. It was fought between an army loyal to Philip V of Spain, Bourbon claimant to the Spanish throne, and one supporting his Habsburg rival, Archduke Charles of Austria. The result was a decisive Bourbon victory that reclaimed most of eastern Spain for Philip.

The Bourbon army was commanded by the Duke of Berwick, illegitimate son of James II of England, while Habsburg forces were led by Henri de Massue, Earl of Galway, an exiled French Huguenot. This makes it "probably the only battle in history in which the English forces were commanded by a Frenchman, the French by an Englishman."

Background

Campaigning in Spain and size of the armies involved were limited by logistics to a greater extent than Flanders or Italy. Reliance on local sources for forage and other supplies limited operations in arid areas like Northern Spain, while until the advent of railways in the 19th century, goods and supplies were largely transported by water. Control of the seas allowed the Allies to successfully conduct short-term offensives outside the coastal areas but lack of popular support meant they could not hold territory. The Grand Alliance secured an operations base in Lisbon when Peter II of Portugal changed sides in May 1703, and the following March, Archduke Charles of Austria arrived to head a land campaign. 

The Bourbon alliance between France and Spain won a series of minor victories along the Spanish-Portuguese border, offset by the British capture of Gibraltar; attempts to retake it were defeated at the naval Battle of Málaga in August 1704, with a land siege being abandoned in April 1705. The 1705 'Pact of Genoa' between English and Catalan representatives opened a second front in the north-east; the Allied capture of Barcelona and Valencia left Toulon as the only major port available to the Bourbons in the Western Mediterranean. 

An attempt in May 1706 by Philip V of Spain to retake Barcelona failed, while his absence allowed an Allied force to capture Madrid and Zaragossa but they could not be resupplied so far from their bases and were forced to withdraw. By November 1706, Philip controlled the Crown of Castile, Murcia and parts of the Kingdom of Valencia. Over the course of 1706, Allied victories in the Spanish Netherlands and Italy forced the French onto the defensive and Galway sought to take advantage by launching a new offensive in 1707. To counter this, James FitzJames, 1st Duke of Berwick, was appointed commander of Bourbon forces in North-East Spain, a total of 33,000 men, split equally between French and Spanish troops, with a number of exiled Irish regiments.  

Before beginning his advance on Valencia, Berwick detached 8,000 men to besiege Xàtiva, prompting the Earl of Peterborough, Allied commander in Spain, to consolidate his forces in Catalonia, rather than combine with the 16,500 troops led by Galway and Minas. This left them badly outnumbered when they moved to intercept Berwick. On 22 April, Berwick halted outside the town of Almansa, from where he could threaten supply lines for the Allied garrison in Valencia.

The battle

The Allies broke camp early on 25 April and reached Almansa after a long and tiring march. Berwick had drawn up his army in two lines, just in front of the town, his infantry in the centre and the French and Spanish cavalry on the wings. Although Galway was clearly outnumbered, he commenced his attack in mid-afternoon after a short artillery exchange. His infantry successfully drove back the Bourbon centre but a gap opened between them and Portuguese troops on the right, under the 63-year-old Marquess of Minas. Seeing this, the Franco-Spanish cavalry attacked; Berwick's account states the Portuguese fought bravely for some time but eventually collapsed and fled. Their retreat was covered by a few squadrons under Das Minas' personal command, including his mistress, who fought dressed as a man and was killed.

The Allied centre was now attacked on three sides; using his remaining cavalry, Galway successfully withdrew some of his troops but 13 battalions lost contact with the rest of the army. Pursued by the Spanish cavalry, they took up a defensive position some 8 miles (12 km) from the battlefield but surrendered the next morning; according to Henry Kamen, allied casualties were 4,000 killed or wounded and 3,000 captured, with Franco-Spanish losses around 5,000 killed or wounded. French military historian Périni claimed Franco-Spanish casualties totalled around 2,000 killed or wounded, with the Allies losing 5,000 casualties and 10,000 prisoners, but from a larger force than 16,500 men. Périni also accepts the bulk of the cavalry escaped, some 3,500 men.  According to Gaston Bodart, the Franco-Spanish lost 2,000 men from an army of 21,000 and the allies 12,000 men (5,000 killed or wounded and 7,000 captured) from a force of 16,000. Finally, according to Joaquim Albareda, the Bourbon forces lost 1,500 men, whereas total allied losses were around 7,000.

Aftermath
Almansa has been described as "the single most important battle fought in Spain". Berwick's tactics were admired by many, Frederick the Great later describing it as the most impressive battle of the century. Victory confirmed Philip's control of North-East Spain and Valencia, while by the end of 1707 the Allies were once again restricted to Catalonia and the Balearic Islands. 

The Franco-Spanish army followed up their success by besieging Xàtiva; when it surrendered in June, much of the town was destroyed and its name changed to 'San Felipe.' In memory of these events, a portrait of the monarch still hangs upside down in the local museum. The defeat and its consequences for the autonomy of Valencia and Catalonia gave rise to two modern proverbs; "De ponent, ni vent ni gent," ('From the west, neither wind nor people') and Quan el mal ve d'Almansa, a tots alcança, ('Bad news from Almansa reaches everybody').

See also
Battle of Almansa reenactment

References

Sources

External links

 3rd centenary of the Battle of Almansa 
 Strategical overview
 La Batalla de Almansa
 Batalla de Almansa
 A description of the battle plus a song from the A Pedlar's Pack of Ballads and Songs
 Panoramic view of the II Recreation of the Battle of Almansa (2009)
 Orders at Battle of Almansa

Almansa
Almansa 1707
Almansa 1707
Almansa 1707
Almansa 1707
Almansa 1707
Almansa 1707
Almansa 1707
1707 in France
War of the Spanish Succession
History of the province of Albacete
Almansa